Emmanuel Adjei Anhwere, (MP) (September 20, 1962) is a Ghanaian politician and the member of parliament in the Seventh Parliament of the Fourth Republic of Ghana and the eighth Parliament of Ghana, representing the people of Atwima-Nwabiagya South constituency of the Ashanti region of Ghana.

Early life and education 
Anhwere was born on 20 September 1962 and hails from Asante Mampong in the Ashanti Region of Ghana. He obtained  BBA from the University of Education Winneba, in 2010. He proceeded to Kwame Nkrumah University of Science and Technology where he obtained CEMBA (Public administration ) in 2015.

Career and politics 
In 2016, Anhwere stood on the ticket of the New Patriotic Party to be elected as the Member of Parliament in the seventh parliament of the Fourth Republic. He won with 48,264 votes out the 58,313 valid votes cast, which represent 83.15% whilst his main opponent on the ticket of the National Democratic Party (NDC) Nana Asare Bediako, obtained 9,780, representing 16,85%. He retained his seat in the 2020 General election to represent his constituents in eighth Parliament of the Fourth Republic. Until his election in 2016, he was the Senior Quality Control Officer of COCOBOD branch in Kumasi.

Personal life 
Emmanuel is a married man with five children. He is a Christian and worship with the Anglican church.

References

Living people
People from Ashanti Region
New Patriotic Party politicians
Ghanaian MPs 2017–2021
Ghanaian MPs 2021–2025
1962 births